Haza (formerly Aza) is a municipality located in the province of Burgos, Castile and León, Spain.

People from Haza
 Joan of Aza (c. 1135 - August 2, 1205) - Catholic Saint and mother of Saint Dominic.

References 

Municipalities in the Province of Burgos